Stow Wengenroth (1906–1978) was an American artist and lithographer, born in 1906 in Brooklyn, New York. Wengenroth was once called "America's greatest living artist working in black and white" by the American realist painter Andrew Wyeth, and he is generally considered to be one of the finest American lithographers of the twentieth century. He studied at the Art Students League of New York under George Bridgman and John Fabian Carlson from 1923 to 1927, then at the Grand Central School of Art under Wayman Adams. Wengenroth was elected a member of the National Institute of Arts and Letters (renamed the American Academy of Arts and Letters) in 1942 and was also a member of the Connecticut Academy of Fine Arts and the Prairie Printmakers. He was elected an Associate of the prestigious National Academy of Design in 1938, and a full Academician in 1941. Wengenroth was also the author of several influential books on lithography.

Wengenroth's lithographs are found in most major American collections, including the Library of Congress, Whitney Museum of American Art, and Metropolitan Museum of Art. During his career, Wengenroth became well known for his detailed depictions of the seascapes and landscapes of New England and, in particular, Maine. As an artist, he eschewed colour in his lithographs but rather focused on shadow, light, and form to transmit detail and dimension. While his urban scenes of Manhattan and the New York City environs are especially coveted by the current market, Wengenroth was most adept at creating sincere yet vivid simulacra of the New England littoral and interior.

Lithographer and painter Elizabeth Saltonstall was one of his students.

Selected exhibitions
 1998: Mary Ryan Gallery, New York: Black & White: Four Decades of Prints, 1905-1947
 1996: Kennedy Galleries, New York: American Master Prints

Selected collections
 Library of Congress, Washington
 Smithsonian American Art Museum, Washington
 Whitney Museum of American Art, New York
 Metropolitan Museum of Art, New York
 Fogg Museum of Art, Cambridge
 Los Angeles County Museum of Art
 Pennsylvania Academy of Fine Arts
 Carnegie Institute, Pittsburgh
 Museum of Fine Arts, Boston
 Boston Public Library

Personal life 
Wengenroth's first wife was the author and doll maker Edith Flack Ackley.

External links
 Artcyclopedia
 Brown University Library (Stow Wengenroth collection)
 Boston Public Library American Printmaking Collection (Stow Wengenroth collection)

Further reading
 McCord, David. Stow Wengenroth's New England. Barre, Mass.: Barre Publishers, 1969.
 Stuckey, Ronald and Joan. The Lithographs of Stow Wengenroth, 1931-1972. New York: Crown Publishers, 1974.
 Stuckey, Ronald and Joan. Stow Wengenroth's Lithographs: A Supplement. New York: Black Oak Publications, 1982.
 Wengenroth, Stow. Making a Lithograph. New York: Studio Publications, 1936.

References

1906 births
1978 deaths
American art
Landscape artists
Members of the American Academy of Arts and Letters
Art Students League of New York alumni
American lithographers
National Academy of Design members
20th-century lithographers